Eremophila campanulata, commonly known as bell-flowered poverty bush, is a flowering plant in the figwort family, Scrophulariaceae and is endemic to a small area in central Western Australia. It is a small, low, densely branched shrub with small leaves and purple or lilac flowers. Its most distinctive feature is the dark purple sepals at the base of the flowers.

Description

The tube is pale lilac-coloured to purple with three broad and two slightly narrower petal lobes on the end. The 4 stamens (sometimes 5 or 6 stamens) extend beyond the petal tube.

Taxonomy and naming
The species was first formally described by Robert Chinnock in 2007 and the description was published in Eremophila and Allied Genera: A Monograph of the Plant Family Myoporaceae. The specific epithet campanulata is a Latin word meaning bell-shaped, referring to the shape of the corolla.

Distribution and habitat
Eremophila campanulata occurs between Prenti Downs and Wongawol in the Gascoyne biogeographic region where it grows in stony clay on low hills.

Conservation
Eremophila campanulata is classified as "Priority Three" by the Western Australian Government Department of Parks and Wildlife meaning that it is poorly known and known from only a few locations but is not under imminent threat.

References

campanulata
Eudicots of Western Australia
Plants described in 2007
Endemic flora of Western Australia